Fleet Controlling is a platform of telematic systems  for wagon-vehicle and mobile equipment that allows service for back-office management in any company. Depending on supplier officers take advantages of:
 collect and send of operating data (on traffic location, activity log, specific performances at certain pins).
 logging data one unit information hidden inside vehicle or machinery (planned routes, assigned tasks, text messages, programming orders for unit itself).
 Receiving commands, information is sent out from the operations centre (alert messages, various reports and evaluations, planning and optimization – for routes and tasks, data operations).
 Integration to system, device is able to connect pin to GPS device.

Processing of certain type of information, data exchange and services provided by Fleet Controlling Equip, and solutions classify it as CEE L.B.S. (Location-based Service).
L.B.S. application allows only location-specific retrieval of information by certain informational registered devices up.

Platform contribution

Fleet Controller Equips are based on stored information about vehicle/machinery location, due to limited pin layout of prior fleet management platform. It is generally a general definition in Track specifications, pgs. 23:

 Text communication device, to data center and informations from|to vehicle|machinery
 Route, personnel and time slots management integration (CEE HoS – Hours of Service) in whole fleet.
 Data reading from CAN, FMS by Poly Carbonate Board pins.
 Upload system for alarm triggered and emergency-rated events (geofencing, fuel consumption leaps, delays).
 Third party system connect option (incl. sensors, devices, and gauges).

Telematic systems execute data transfer via GPRS or satellite, vehicle location is recognized by GPS.

Development
First reference to Fleet Controlling platform is dated back to 2007 when it was officially mentioned in Munich`s Transport Logistic exhibition in Germany.
Integrated Fleet Control management evolved from a previous generation of Fleet Management system in feature like: new generation of hardware, closer system integration (also with third party information systems integration).

References

Road transport
Fleet management